Na Alaj (also Romanized as Nā ‘Alāj) is a village in Chehel Chay Rural District, in the Central District of Minudasht County, Golestan Province, Iran. At the 2006 census, its population was 20, in 8 families.

References 

Populated places in Minudasht County